Warren Lee may refer to:

Warren Lee (cricketer) (born 1987), Indian-born English cricketer
Warren Lee (footballer) (born 1958), Australian rules footballer
Warren Lee (pianist), Hong Kong-born pianist and music educator
Warren Lee (politician), Singapore, see Sembawang Group Representation Constituency
Warren I. Lee (1876–1955), U.S. Representative from New York

See also
Lee Warren (born 1969), English footballer who plays for Stocksbridge Park Steels
Gerald Lee Warren (born 1930), American journalist and newspaper editor at the San Diego Union-Tribune